Spring House is a census-designated place (CDP) in Lower Gwynedd Township, Montgomery County, Pennsylvania, United States. The population was 3,978 at the 2020 census.

Geography

Spring House is located at  (40.183091, -75.231204).

Demographics

As of the 2010 census, the CDP was 87.2% Non-Hispanic White, 2.3% Black or African American, 7.8% Asian, 0.2% were Some Other Race, and 1.1% were two or more races. 1.8% of the population were of Hispanic or Latino ancestry.

At the 2000 census there were 3,290 people, 1,347 households, and 893 families living in the CDP. The population density was 1,275.1 people per square mile (492.4/km2). There were 1,396 housing units at an average density of 541.0/sq mi (208.9/km2).  The racial makeup of the CDP was 93.50% White, 2.28% African American, 3.59% Asian, 0.03% Pacific Islander, 0.15% from other races, and 0.46% from two or more races. Hispanic or Latino of any race were 0.67%.

There were 1,347 households, 26.9% had children under the age of 18 living with them, 60.9% were married couples living together, 4.5% had a female householder with no husband present, and 33.7% were non-families. 31.6% of households were made up of individuals, and 22.2% were one person aged 65 or older. The average household size was 2.31 and the average family size was 2.92.

The age distribution was 21.3% under the age of 18, 2.9% from 18 to 24, 19.1% from 25 to 44, 27.1% from 45 to 64, and 29.5% 65 or older. The median age was 49 years. For every 100 females, there were 78.1 males. For every 100 females age 18 and over, there were 73.5 males.

The median household income was $89,000 and the median family income  was $118,256. Males had a median income of $100,000 versus $63,571 for females. The per capita income for the CDP was $47,661. About 1.1% of families and 3.1% of the population were below the poverty line, including 5.0% of those under age 18 and 1.5% of those age 65 or over.

Gallery

References

External links

Census-designated places in Montgomery County, Pennsylvania
Census-designated places in Pennsylvania